Bhageshwar is a Gaupalika in Dadeldhura District in the Sudurpashchim Province of far-western Nepal. Bhageshwar has a population of 14129.The land area is 233.38 km2.

References

Rural municipalities in Dadeldhura District
Rural municipalities of Nepal established in 2017